The Museum of American Finance is the United States's only independent public museum dedicated to preserving, exhibiting and teaching about American finance and financial history.  Located in the Financial District in Manhattan, New York City, it is an affiliate of the Smithsonian Institution. It is a tax-exempt 501(c)(3) organization chartered by the Board of Regents of the New York State Department of Education. With education at the core of its mission, it is an active national-level advocate on behalf of financial literacy.

The museum was founded in 1988 as the Museum of American Financial History but was renamed the Museum of American Finance in 2005. Until December 2006, it was located at 26 Broadway. On January 11, 2008, the Museum opened in a new location at 48 Wall Street, the former headquarters of the Bank of New York. In 2018, their building experienced a flood and as of October 2022, they remain in search of a permanent home.

Financial education

In 2010, the Museum founded its Center for Financial Education, which offers classroom programs for students in grades kindergarten through masters of business administration (MBA) in addition to its tour programs. In 2011, it launched the Museum Finance Academy (MFA), an eight-week after school personal finance program open to high school juniors and seniors.  In 2011–2013, the Museum partnered with Junior Achievement to offer its "Finance Park" program within the Center for Financial Education.

Collections and exhibitions
As part of its mission to document US financial history, the Museum actively collects documents and artifacts related to the financial markets, money and banking. Its world-class collection includes more than 10,000 stocks, bonds, prints, engravings, photographs, bank notes, checks and books.

Permanent exhibitions focus on the financial markets, money, banking, entrepreneurship and Alexander Hamilton. Temporary exhibitions have included "Barings in America: An Interactive Investment Experience" (December 2012 – April 2013), "Checks & Balances: Presidents and American Finance" (November 2011 – March 2013), "Tracking the Credit Crisis" (ongoing since 2009); "Alexander Hamilton: Lineage and Legacy" (April 2011 – March 2012); "Scandal! Financial Crime Chicanery and Corruption That Rocked America" (2010–11) and "Women of Wall Street" (2009–10).

The exhibit "Alexander Hamilton: Indispensable Founder and Visionary" had its grand opening on October 29, 2014. Former Secretary of the Treasury Timothy Geithner cut the ribbon to open the exhibit, which is located in the Hamilton room in the museum. The exhibit was co-curated by John Herzog, Founder of the Museum of American Finance, and Mariana Oller, the Chair of the Alexander Hamilton Awareness Society.This exhibit was created to commemorate the 225th anniversary of Alexander Hamilton becoming the first Secretary of the Treasury that year. The exhibit is currently one of the main attractions of the Museum, and features rare objects associated with Alexander Hamilton and his financial programs.

Their collections were not harmed in the flood that closed the museum's Wall Street location in 2018.

Programs and events
Prominent speakers from across the financial industry participate in the Museum's Financial History and Practices Lecture/Symposia Series, with subject matter ranging from discussions of current financial practices to observations on significant events and individuals in America's financial history.  Speakers have included John Bogle, Sallie Krawcheck, David Walker, Abby Joseph Cohen, Henry Kaufman, Niall Ferguson and Neil Barofsky.

Other programs include the Lunch and Learn Series, which features talks, demonstrations and presentations during lunchtime, as well as walking tours and film screenings.  The Museum's annual gala honors an individual with the Whitehead Award for Distinguished Public Service and Financial Leadership, which is named after former Deputy Secretary of State and co-chair of Goldman Sachs John C. Whitehead.  Honorees have included Paul Volcker, Pete Peterson, William Donaldson, Felix Rohatyn and William Harrison Jr.

Since 2012, the Museum of American Finance has partnered with the Alexander Hamilton Awareness Society co-hosting several events of the yearly CelebrateHAMILTON and Happy Birthday Hamilton! programs in July and January. Events included "The Essence of Alexander Hamilton's Greatness" by AHA Society founder, Rand Scholet, Hamilton vs. Jefferson historical interpreters "Debate", "Conversation with the Curators" with John Herzog, founder of the Museum of American Finance and Mariana Oller, Chair of the Alexander Hamilton Awareness Society on the process of collecting original Hamilton documents and then creating the "Alexander Hamilton: Indispensable Founder and Visionary" exhibit with them, the "New Discoveries in the life of Alexander Hamilton" Talk by Author and Historian Michael E. Newton, and the presentation of his new book "Alexander Hamilton – The Formative Years".

Publications
The Museum also regularly publishes on subjects pertaining to the history of finance. Its quarterly magazine, Financial History, reaches members in 50 US states and 20 other countries.  The magazine publishes vetted articles by financial historians and journalists on historically significant events and individuals and other related topics in the world of finance. In 2011, the Museum commemorated the 100th issue of Financial History with a full-color double edition. The Museum also publishes books and catalogs including, most recently, The Revolutionary Beginning of the American Stock Market, which features many of the documents in the "America's First IPO" exhibit.

Intellectual leadership
In 1987, John E. Herzog, then CEO of Herzog Heine Geduld, Inc., established the Museum in response to the stock market crash of that year. He provided the bulk of the institution's early leadership and is now chairman and trustee emeritus. The Museum's intellectual leadership is currently provided by eminent financial historians, including board trustee Niall Ferguson, chairman of the board Richard E. Sylla, President and CEO David Cowen, and Financial History magazine editorial board member Robert E. Wright.

Gallery

See also

Culture of New York City
History of New York City
List of museums and cultural institutions in New York City
List of museums in New York

References

External links

1988 establishments in New York City
Finance in the United States
History museums in New York City
Museums established in 1988
Museums in Manhattan
Museums of economics
Numismatic museums in the United States
Smithsonian Institution affiliates
Financial District, Manhattan
Financial history of the United States